Max Castillo may refer to:

Max Castillo (university president), fourth president of the University of Houston–Downtown (UHD), 1992–2009
Max Castillo (baseball) (born 1999), Venezuelan professional baseball pitcher for the Kansas City Royals